Gliese 1061 is a red dwarf star located approximately  from Earth in the southern constellation of Horologium. Even though it is a relatively nearby star, it has an apparent visual magnitude of about 13, so it can only be seen with at least a moderately-sized telescope.

The proper motion of Gliese 1061 has been known since 1974, but it was estimated to be further away: approximately  distant based upon an estimated parallax of 0.130″. The RECONS accurately determined its distance in 1997. At that time, it was the 20th-nearest star system to the Sun. The discovery team noted that many more stars like this are likely to be discovered nearby.

This star is a tiny, dim, red dwarf, close to the lower mass limit. It has an estimated mass of about 12.5% that of the Sun and is only about 0.2% as luminous. The star displays no significant infrared excess due to circumstellar dust.

Planetary system

On August 13, 2019, a planetary system was announced orbiting the star Gliese 1061 by the Red Dots project for detecting terrestrial planets around nearby red dwarf stars. The planet Gliese 1061 d orbits in the conservative circumstellar habitable zone of its star and the planet Gliese 1061 c orbits in the inner edge of the habitable zone. Gliese 1061 is a non-variable star that does not suffer flares, so there is a greater probability that the exoplanets still conserve their atmosphere if they had one.

Gliese 1061 c

Gliese 1061 c (also known as GJ 1061 c) is a potentially habitable exoplanet orbiting within the limits of the optimistic defined habitable zone of its red dwarf parent star.

Gliese 1061 c is 75% more massive than the Earth.

The average temperature on the surface would be warmer, provided the atmosphere is of similar composition to the Earth's.

Gliese 1061 c orbits its parent star very closely, every 6.7 days at a distance of just 0.035 au, so it is probably gravitationally locked and in synchronous rotation with its star.

Gliese 1061 d

Gliese 1061 d (also known as GJ 1061 d) is a potentially habitable exoplanet largely orbiting within the limits of the conservative defined habitable zone of its parent red dwarf star.

The exoplanet is 68% more massive than the Earth.

Gliese 1061 d orbits its star every 13 days, and due to its close-in semi-major axis, it is likely that the exoplanet is tidally locked. However, if the planet's orbit is confirmed to be highly eccentric then this eccentricity could be desynchronising it, enabling the existence of non-synchronised states of equilibrium in its rotation, relative to which side of the planet is facing the star, and thereby it will experience a day/night cycle.

See also
 List of nearest stars and brown dwarfs
 Research Consortium On Nearby Stars

Notes

References

External links
 SolStation.com: GJ 1061

1061
Horologium (constellation)
Local Bubble
M-type main-sequence stars
Planetary systems with three confirmed planets
TIC objects